Carla is a British television crime drama film, based upon the novel Improvising Carla by Joanna Hines, first broadcast on ITV on 15 September 2003. The film, adapted for television by writer Barbara Machin and director Diarmuid Lawrence, stars Lesley Sharp and Helen McCrory as Helen North and Carla French, two women who become friends after meeting on holiday on the Greek Islands. But when Carla is later found dead on an isolated Island road, with only Helen by her side, the subsequent investigation reveals that from the start, their alliance was based on fantasy and lies.

Filming took place on the island of Kythira, Greece. The Guardian were critical of the adaptation, writing; "The précis doesn't quite transmit the subtler nuances of the plot, which was a cracking one, deftly realised by a trio of fine actors and some sterling support. But of course, spelling it all out doesn't work, not even in the justifiable context of TV criticism". The film drew 7.25 million viewers on its debut broadcast. The film was uploaded in its entirety to YouTube on 8 July 2011, having never received an official home video release.

Cast
 Lesley Sharp as Helen North
 Helen McCrory as Carla French
 Iain Glen as Daniel French
 Shaun Dingwall as Paul
 Michael Fassbender as Rob
 Henry Ian Cusick as Matt
 Eve Polycarpou as Sevasti
 Dimitri Andreas as Manoli
 Su Elliot as Mrs. Bryant
 Albert Welling as Mr. Bryant
 Philip Fox as Mr. Carter
 Melanie Kilburn as Mrs. Carter
 Vaggelis Kloufetos as Detective Sireus
 Michael Bertenshaw as Coroner
 Lucy Robinson as Pathologist

References

External links

2003 television films
2003 films
British crime drama films
ITV television dramas
Films shot in the United Kingdom
2003 crime drama films
2000s English-language films
2000s British films
British drama television films